"Daydreaming" is a song by Massive Attack with vocals by Shara Nelson. The song samples "Mambo" by Wally Badarou (the "fifth member" of Level 42), from his album "Echoes" (1984). "Daydreaming" was released as a single on 15 October 1990, six months before their debut album Blue Lines. It reached #81 in the UK Singles Chart.

Track listing

7" single (WBRS 1)
"Daydreaming" – 4:12
"Daydreaming" (Instrumental) – 4:45

12" single (WBRT 1)
"Daydreaming" – 4:12
"Daydreaming" (Instrumental) – 4:45
"Any Love" (2) - 4:16

CD single (WBRX 1)
"Daydreaming" – 4:12
"Daydreaming" (Instrumental) – 4:45
"Any Love" (2) - 4:16

12" remix single (WBRR 1)
"Daydreaming" (Luv It Mix) – 5:27
"Daydreaming" (Brixton Bass Mix) – 5:22
"Daydreaming" (Luv It Dub) - 5:26

Charts

Weekly charts

References

External links

Massive Attack songs
1990 songs
Black-and-white music videos
Songs written by Daddy G
Songs written by Andrew Vowles
Songs written by Robert Del Naja
Songs written by Wally Badarou
Songs written by Shara Nelson
Song recordings produced by Jonny Dollar
Music videos directed by Baillie Walsh